Sarona Market is the largest enclosed culinary market in Israel., located in the southern edge of the city's Templer Colony restoration project in Sarona, Tel Aviv. Sarona Market was constructed by Gindi Holdings and opened in 2015, and is the first indoor market in Israel.  After its establishment, other enclosed markets were built throughout the country. In Sarona Market, there are about 90 businesses, including retail stores, food stands and restaurants. The complex is a popular tourist attraction

Development and architecture
Sarona Market was established in 2015, as part of Sarona Park in the south of the Kirya compound, between the reconstructed houses of the Templer colony. It was designed by architects Kika Braz, Uri Ben Dror and Michael Ankawa from Studio Mo. The project was built by Gindi Holdings. The market complex was established with an investment of over 530 million. It covers an area of 8,700 square meters.

Terrorist attack 

On June 8, 2016, there was a Palestinian terrorist shooting at the Max Brenner restaurant in Sarona Market, they killed four people and injured 16 others.

References

External links
 saronamarket's instagram
 Sarona Market on tripadvisor 
 שרונה מרקט חוגג שלוש: "יצרנו חוויה לכל החושים"
 ארוחת הטעימות הגדולה של תל אביב
 What to do in Sarona Market

2015 establishments in Israel
Buildings and structures completed in 2015
Retail markets in Israel
Buildings and structures in Tel Aviv
Tourist attractions in Tel Aviv
Food markets